The California State Association of Counties (CSAC) is a lobbying, advocacy and service organization representing the state's 58 counties at the state and federal level. Areas of focus include the state budget, health-care reform, corrections reform, transportation funding, water and climate change.

CSAC is governed by a 62-member board of directors and 15-member executive committee, led by Matt Cate, executive director. Mr. Cate previously served as the Secretary of the California Department of Corrections and Rehabilitation (CDCR). As of 2010, the organization has an annual operating budget of $8.7 million. The organization's offices are a block from the state's capitol building in Sacramento

In 2009 during California's budget crisis, the organization pushed for additional funding for counties and helped draft a lawsuit opposing a proposed plan to divert about $4 billion in tax revenues to the state from local governments.

History

The organization's origins date back to informal meetings among county supervisors.  The County Boards of Supervisors Association of California began meeting in 1895, later becoming the County Supervisors Association of California and then, in 1991, the California State Association of Counties.

Related organizations 

The CSAC has founded or co-founded the following organizations:

The CSAC Finance Corporation provides  municipal finance services to counties and private entities that serve county residents.
The CSAC Institute for Excellence in County Government provides continuing education for county elected officials and senior staff; co-presents courses  with the University of Southern California, California State University, Sacramento and the Institute for Local Government.
The California Statewide Communities Development Authority, which provides bond negotiations and other services to  counties and cities.

The CSAC is also closely affiliated with the County Engineers Association of California.

References

External links 
 CSAC — official site
 CSAC Finance Corporation
 CSAC Institute for Excellence in County Government
 National Association of Counties
 Institute for Local Government
 CCS Partnership
 California Communities
 US Communities
 Universitas Esa Unggul

 
Organizations based in Sacramento, California
United States Associations of Counties